The 160s decade ran from January 1, 160, to December 31, 169.

Significant people 
 Marcus Aurelius, Roman Emperor
 Lucius Verus, Roman Emperor
 Commodus (b. 161)

References